The Marshall Islands competed at the 2011 Pacific Games in Nouméa, New Caledonia between August 27 and September 10, 2011. As of June 28, 2011 Marshall Islands has listed 8 competitors.

Athletics

Marshall Islands has qualified 1 athletes.

Women
Haley Nemra

Swimming

Marshall Islands has qualified 3 athletes.

Men
Giordan Harris
Daniel Langinbelik

Women
Ann-Marie Hepler

References

2011 in Marshallese sports
Nations at the 2011 Pacific Games
Marshall Islands at the Pacific Games